G.I. War Brides is a 1946 American comedy film directed by George Blair and written by John K. Butler. The film stars Anna Lee, James Ellison, Harry Davenport, William "Bill" Henry, Stephanie Bachelor, Doris Lloyd and Robert Armstrong. The film was released on August 12, 1946, by Republic Pictures.

Plot

Cast   
Anna Lee as Linda Powell
James Ellison as Steve Giles
Harry Davenport as Grandpa Giles
William "Bill" Henry as Capt. Roger Kirby
Stephanie Bachelor as Elizabeth Wunderlich
Doris Lloyd as Beatrice Moraski
Robert Armstrong as Dawson
Joe Sawyer as Sgt. Frank Moraski 
Mary McLeod as Kathleen Fitzpatrick
Carol Savage as Joyce (Mrs. Steve) Giles
Patricia Edwards as Margaret Lee
Helen Gerald as Ruth Giles
Patrick O'Moore as Harold R. Williams 
Maxine Jennings as WAC Sgt. Polly Williams
Russell Hicks as Insp. Ramsaye
Francis Pierlot as Mr. Wunderlich
Pierre Watkin as Editor
Eugene Lay as Donnie
Lois Austin as Miss Nolan
Virginia Carroll as Helen Mayo
Lester Dorr as Steward (uncredited)

References

External links 
 

1946 films
American comedy films
1946 comedy films
Republic Pictures films
Films directed by George Blair
American black-and-white films
1940s English-language films
1940s American films